Lambe is a surname, and may refer to:

 Anna Lambe, Canadian actress
 Charles Lambe (1900–1960), Royal Navy admiral
 Charles Laverock Lambe (1875–1953), Royal Air Force air marshal
 Claire Lambe (artist) (born 1962), English-born Australian artist
 John Lambe ( – 1628), English astrologer
 John Lambe (M5 rapist) (born 1944), English criminal
 Lawrence Lambe (1863–1919), Canadian palaeontologist
 Lisa Lambe (born 1984), Irish singer and performer
 Reggie Lambe (born 1991), Bermudian professional footballer
 Robert Lambe (author) (1711–1795), English Anglican priest and writer

Lambe is also the name of a letter in the Tengwar script.

See also
 Lamb (surname)
 Lambie